Robert Briggs (1929–2015) was an American author and poet associated with the Beat Generation. He read poetry in the Jazz Cellar in San Francisco in 1957, and said, "jazz is to music what poetry is to knowing." He continued to give reads accompanied by jazz musicians up until 2012. In 1972, Briggs co-founded the San Francisco Book Company and then Robert Briggs Associates, as a literary agent and small West Coast publisher. The company was involved in a variety of nonfiction which included "Rolling Thunder: An Exploration into the Powers of an American Indian Medicine Man," by Doug Boyd, :Mind as Healer, Mind as Slayer," Kenneth Pelletier's classic book on stress as well as works by Joseph Campbell, Colin Wilson, and Theodore Roszak. In the 1950s he was a bookseller in Greenwich Village, New York, then in North Beach in San Francisco. Robert Briggs served in the Army during the Korean War and witnessed an atom bomb test in Frenchman Flats, Nevada. Filmmaker Chel White directed a short film about Briggs' atom bomb experience entitled, "The Beats, the Bomb and the 1950s."

Personal life

April 2019 – Hill Sheperd
Along with his wife, author Diana Saltoon, Briggs was a young poet in San Francisco. Later in life he was member of the Zen Community of Oregon, with Diana.  
He had one child, his daughter Hillary Shannon Briggs Sheperd in 1963. He married Barbara Steele Briggs from Washington D.C. in 1963. They lived in a Bohemian Mission District, in the City by the Bay, with a cool cat, "Fireway."  Briggs and Barbara parted ways within a year of marriage. He lived in a series of great flats and had great friends, the Reid brothers and Peter Bonet, a restaurateur in Sausalito/Marin.

Books 
Wife, Just Let Go: Zen, Alzheimer's, and Love (2017)
Ruined Time: The 1950s and the Beat (2007)
The American Emergency: A Search for Spiritual Renewal in an Age of Materialism (1989)

Audio recordings 
Poetry and the 1950s: Homage to the Beat Generation (1999)
Jazz and Poetry & Other Reasons – Opus One: The Beat Goes On (2007)
Poetry: A Return to Greenwich Village (2012)

See also
Jack Kerouac
Lawrence Ferlinghetti
David Meltzer
Joanne Kyger
Hettie Jones
Joyce Johnson
Ann Charters
Allen Ginsberg

References

External links
 

2015 deaths
1929 births
Writers from Oregon
American male poets